was a French-based radical libertarian socialist group of the post-World War II period whose name comes from a phrase which was misattributed to Friedrich Engels by Rosa Luxemburg in the Junius Pamphlet, but which probably was most likely first used by Karl Kautsky. It existed from 1948 until 1967. The animating personality was Cornelius Castoriadis, also known as Pierre Chaulieu or Paul Cardan. Socialisme ou Barbarie (S. ou B.) is also the name of the group's journal.

History
The group originated in the Trotskyist Fourth International, where Castoriadis and Claude Lefort constituted a Chaulieu–Montal tendency in the French Parti Communiste Internationaliste in 1946. In 1948, they experienced their "final disenchantment with Trotskyism", leading them to break away to form Socialisme ou Barbarie, whose journal began appearing in March 1949. Castoriadis later said of this period that "the main audience of the group and of the journal was formed by groups of the old, radical left: Bordigists, council communists, some anarchists and some offspring of the German 'left' of the 1920s

They developed parallel to, and were in dialogue with, the Johnson–Forest Tendency, which developed as a body of ideas within American Trotskyist organisations. One faction of this group later formed Facing Reality. The early days also brought debate with Anton Pannekoek and an influx of ex-Bordigists into the group.

The group was composed of both intellectuals and workers, and agreed with the idea that the main enemies of society were the bureaucracies which governed modern capitalism. They documented and analysed the struggle against that bureaucracy in the group's journal. The thirteenth issue (January–March 1954), as an example, was devoted to the East German revolt of June 1953 and the strikes which erupted amongst several sectors of French workers that summer.  Following from the belief that what the working class was addressing in their daily struggles was the real content of socialism, the intellectuals encouraged the workers in the group to report on every aspect of their working lives.

Socialisme ou Barbarie was critical of Leninism, rejecting the idea of a revolutionary party, and placing an emphasis on the importance of workers' councils. While some members left to form other groups, those remaining became more and more critical of Marxism over time.  Jean Laplanche, one of the group's founding members, recalls the early days of the organization: 

The Hungarian Revolution and other events of the mid-1950s led to a further influx into the group. By this time, they were proposing the fundamental point as

This became characterised as a distinction between the dirigeant and exécutant in French, usually translated as order-givers and order-takers. This perspective enabled the group to extend its understanding to the new forms of social conflict emerging outside the realm of production as such. That was also the case for the 1960-1961 Winter General Strike in Wallonia.

After the May 1958 crisis and an influx of new meeting attendees, disagreements on the organisational role of a political group led to the departure of some prominent members including Claude Lefort and Henri Simon to form Informations et Liaison Ouvrières.

By 1960, the group had grown to around 100 members and had developed new international links, primarily in the emergence of a sister organisation in Britain called Solidarity.

In the early 1960s, disputes within the group around Castoriadis' increasing rejection of Marxism led to the departure of the group around the Pouvoir Ouvrier journal. The main Socialisme ou Barbarie journal continued publishing until a final edition in 1965, after which the group became dormant and announced its indefinite suspension in June 1967. An attempt by Castoriadis to revive it during the May 1968 events failed.

The Situationist International was influenced by Socialisme ou Barbarie through Guy Debord (who was a member of both), as too was Socialisme ou Barbarie influenced by Debord and the situationists.  The Italian social movement of Autonomia were also influenced, but less directly.

Members 

Members of Socialisme ou Barbarie included:
 Danièle Auffray, b. 1943. Left SouB around 1965.
 Daniel Blanchard (as Pierre Canjuers), b. 1934. SouB: 1957–1965.
 Pierre Canjuers, Guy Debord: Preliminaires pour une définition de l'unité du programme révolutionaire, Paris (July 20), 1960, (4 p.).
 Transl. in: Ken Knabb, Situationist International Anthology, Berkeley, 1981, p. 305ff..
 Cornelius Castoriadis (1922–1997).
 Various reprints, Union Génerale d'Éditions, 10/18 series, 7 Vols., 3 in 2 books, Paris, 1973 to 1979; Political and Social Writings, David Ames Curtis (editor, transl.), 3 Vols., Minneapolis, 1988, 1993.
 Hubert Damisch, b. 1928. SouB: 1953–1958.
 Guy Debord (1931–1994). SouB: One year from 1960 to 1961. Programmatic statement, with Daniel Blanchard
 Vincent Descombes, b. 1943.
 Jacques Gautrat (as Daniel Mothé), b. 1924. SouB from 1952. As Daniel Mothé: Journal d'un ouvrier, 1956-1958, Éditions de Minuit, Paris, 1959.
 Gérard Genette, b. 1930. SouB: 1957–1958.
 Pierre Guillaume, b. 1941 (or 1940 ?). SouB: 1960–1963 (PO).
 Alain Guillerm (1944–2005). SouB: 1962–1967.
 Jean Laplanche (as Marc Foucault) (1924–2012).
 Claude Lefort (as Claude Montal) (1924–2010). SouB until 1958.
 Jean-François Lyotard (1924–1998). SouB: 1950–1963 (PO).
 Albert Masó (as Vega, R.Maille) (1918–2001). Spanish anarchist, POUM. SouB: 1950-1963 (PO). La Bataille socialiste Masó page.
 Edgar Morin, b. 1921 (some sources have him as a member in the early 1950s).
 Henri Simon, b. 1922. SouB: 1952–1958.
 Ngo Van,  1913–2005 
 Pierre Souyri (as Pierre Brune) (1925–1981). SouB: 1954–1963 (PO). La Bataille socialiste Souyri page.
 Benno Sternberg (as Hugo Bell, Sarel, Barois), member from 1949 to 1967. He died in 1971. As Benno Sarel: La classe ouvrière en Allemagne orientale, Éditions Ouvrières,  Paris 1958 (Turin, 1959; Munich, 1975).
 Translated for SouB: Paul Romano and Ria Stone: The American Worker, Bewick, Detroit, 1947.

Source: Andrea Gabler: Arbeitsanalyse und Selbstbestimmung. Zur Bedeutung und Aktualität von “Socialisme ou Barbarie“, Göttingen, 2006. This is a dissertation for the Doktor (Ph. D.) in social sciences from the Georg-August-Universität at Göttingen. Her many biographies are in Anhang C, pp. 210– 223.

Texts 
The forty issues of Socialisme ou barbarie have been digitised and there have been numerous reprints of SouB articles under the name of their authors, especially of Castoriadis' texts.

A Socialisme ou Barbarie Anthology: Autonomy, Critique, and Revolution in the Age of Bureaucratic Capitalism. London: Eris: 2018. A complete translation of the 2007 Acratie Anthologie, plus additional translations of Socialisme ou Barbarie texts dealing with American and British workers' struggle.

Notes

References 
 
 Philippe Gottraux. Socialisme ou Barbarie, un engagement politique et intellectuel dans la France de l'après guerre. Lausanne: Payot, 1997.
 Stephen Hastings-King. Looking for the Proletariat: Socialisme ou Barbarie and the Problem of Worker Writing. Leiden and Boston: Brill, 2014. Paperback ed. Chicago, IL: Haymarket Books : 2015.
 Anthony Hayes. How the Situationist International became what it was, PhD thesis, Australian National University, 2017, chapters five, seven and Appendix three.
 
 , Les intellectuels sous la Ve Republique (1958-1990), vol. 2, Hachette-Pluriel, 1995, pp. 89–95.
 Peter Starr, Logics of Failed Revolt: French Theory After May '68, Stanford University Press, 1995, p. 24. .

External links 
 A Socialisme ou Barbarie Anthology: Autonomy, Critique, Revolution in the Age of Bureaucratic Capitalism, trans. from the French and ed. anonymously as a public service (online copy of 2018 Eris [London] edition)
 Socialisme ou Barbarie review scanning project
 SouBTrans Project Website, with an ever-growing list of Socialisme ou Barbarie texts translated into various languages.
 Sommaires de la revue Socialisme ou Barbarie (1949-1967) - The 40 issues of Socialisme ou Barbarie in PDF
 Exchange of letters between Cornelius Castoriadis and Anton Pannekoek, originally published in Socialisme ou Barbarie, translated and introduced by Viewpoint Magazine.
  Socialisme ou Barbarie: A French Revolutionary Group (1949-65) by Marcel van der Linden, Left History 5.1, 1997. Dead GeoCities link, now at the La Bataille socialiste site.
  From the German Left to Socialisme ou Barbarie from La Banquise No. 2: le roman de nos origines, 1983.
 Libertarian Communist Library Socialisme ou Barbarie holdings
   Socialisme ou Barbarie Journal index of articles by issue
 How the Situationist International became what it was, PhD thesis, Australian National University, 2017. Substantial discussion of the relationship between Socialisme ou Barbarie and the Situationist International.

1948 establishments in France
1967 disestablishments in France
Defunct political magazines published in France
Defunct political parties in France
Far-left politics in France
French-language magazines
Libertarian socialist organizations
Magazines established in 1948
Magazines disestablished in 1965
Political parties established in 1948
Political parties disestablished in 1967
Socialist parties in France